Sound Sun Pleasure!! is an album by the American Jazz musician Sun Ra and his Astro Infinity Arkestra. Recorded March 6, 1959, it remained unreleased until 1970 when it was issued on the Saturn label. Recorded at the same time and with the same personnel as Jazz in Silhouette, the album is unusual amongst early Ra albums for predominantly featuring jazz standards.

The album has been reissued on CD by the Evidence label with 7 tracks taken from the 1973 Saturn album Deep Purple recorded between 1953 and 1957.

Track listing

12" Vinyl
Side A:
"'Round Midnight" (Hanighen, Monk, Williams) - (3.55)
"You Never Told Me That You Care" (Hobart Dotson) - (5.37)
"Hour of Parting" (Schiffer, Spoliansky) - (4.53)

Side B:
"Back in Your Own Backyard" (Jolson, Rose, Dreyer) - (2.07)
"Enlightenment (taken from Jazz in Silhouette)" (Dotson, Ra) - (5.09)
"I Could Have Danced All Night" (Lerner, Loewe) - (3.11)

Musicians 
Sun Ra - piano, celeste, gong
Hobart Dotson - trumpet
Marshall Allen - alto sax, flute
James Spaulding - alto sax, flute, percussion
John Gilmore - tenor sax, percussion
Bo Bailey - Trombone
Pat Patrick - baritone sax, flute, Percussion
Charles Davis - baritone sax, percussion
Ronnie Boykins - bass
William Cochran - drums
Hattie Randolph - vocals

References

Complete Sun Ra's Discography

Sun Ra albums
1959 albums
El Saturn Records albums
Evidence Music albums